Ptaeroxylaceae Juss. are a small family of Southern African indigenous trees and woody lianes, most of them from Madagascar, comprising only two genera. Such a family was not recognized by the APG II system of classification (2003), which noted that it was a synonym of Rutaceae. The APG III system of 2009, an updated version of the last system, did not mention the family. All species within this family are included within Rutaceae.

The family Ptaeroxylaceae was recognized by the Thorne system (1992), Dahlgren system, and Reveal system and placed in the Rutales.

Genus: Cedrelopsis  Baill.

Species:

 Cedrelopsis ambanjensis J.F. Leroy
 Cedrelopsis gracilis J.F. Leroy
 Cedrelopsis grevei Baill. & Courchet
 Cedrelopsis longibracteata J.F. Leroy
 Cedrelopsis microfoliolata J.F. Leroy
 Cedrelopsis procera J.F. Leroy
 Cedrelopsis rakotozafyi Cheek & M. Lescot
 Cedrelopsis trivalvis J.F. Leroy

Genus: Ptaeroxylon Ecklon & Zeyher, 1834 
Ptaeroxylon obliquum (Thunb.) Radlk. (Ptaeroxylon utile)

References

Sapindales families
Historically recognized angiosperm families
Trees of Africa